Isle of Man national football team may refer to:

Ellan Vannin football team
Isle of Man official football team